Timothy Randolph Stanley (born 1 January 1982) is a British journalist and historian.

Early life

Stanley was educated at The Judd School, a grammar school in Tonbridge, Kent. He then worked as a gap student at Solefield School, Sevenoaks and attended Trinity College, Cambridge, where he studied modern history.

He graduated from the University of Cambridge with a Bachelor of Arts (BA) degree, a Master of Philosophy (MPhil) degree, and a Doctor of Philosophy (PhD) degree. His doctoral thesis was on Edward M. Kennedy's role in the US Democratic Party in the 1980s, which was published in 2010 as his first solo book, Kennedy vs. Carter: The 1980 Battle for the Democratic Party's Soul.

At Cambridge he was active in student journalism, contributing to student newspaper Varsity. Stanley also unsuccessfully ran for a sabbatical post on Cambridge University Students' Union, standing in 2007 for Welfare Officer. His manifesto consisted of a handwritten note simply reading "This is hand written because I was too drunk to write a manifesto. There is no better testament to my character."

Academic career
Stanley held lectureships at the University of Sussex in 2008–09 and Royal Holloway, University of London, in 2009–11, and from 2011 to 2012 he was an associate member of the Rothermere American Institute at the University of Oxford. He is the recipient of a Leverhulme Trust Grant.

In November 2011, he organised a conference called History: What is it good for?, which generated some controversy after one of the speakers, David Starkey, said that the national curriculum in British schools overlooks British culture.

Media
Stanley is a columnist at the Daily Telegraph and a regular contributor to CNN. He reports on American politics and culture, including the 2016 election campaigns. He contributes to History Today and Literary Review, and has written pieces for The Guardian and The Spectator.

He wrote and presented a documentary for the BBC entitled Family Guys? What Sitcoms Say About America Now, which was broadcast in October 2012. He is also an occasional pundit on BBC News, CNBC, Sky News and Channel 4 News.

Stanley has presented Radio 4's Thought for the Day, is a contributor on The Moral Maze and has appeared several times on the panel of BBC's Question Time. and Politics Live.

Politics
Stanley joined the Labour Party at the age of 15. He was Chair of Cambridge University Labour Club in 2003–04, and stood as the Labour candidate for his home constituency of Sevenoaks at the 2005 general election, where he came third. He has since distanced himself from the Labour Party, and has argued in support of the American Republican Party. In the 2017 general election, Stanley allied himself with the Conservative Party and voted for them for the first time. 

Stanley was a strong supporter of the campaign for the UK to leave the European Union.

Personal life
In October 2012, Stanley stated he was "raised a good Baptist boy".

Later, he considered himself to be an Anglican, beginning around "one glorious summer" in 2002, and was baptised as an Anglican in Little St. Mary's, Cambridge, in New Year 2003. He subsequently aligned himself with the Church of England's Anglo-Catholic wing, before converting to the Catholic Church when he was 23.

Publications
 Tim Stanley, Whatever Happened to Tradition?: History, Belonging and the Future of the West (Bloomsbury Continuum, 2021) 
Timothy Stanley and Alexander Lee, The End of Politics: Realignment and the Battle for the Centre Ground (London: Politico's, London, 2006) 
Timothy Stanley, Kennedy vs. Carter: The 1980 Battle for the Democratic Party's Soul (Lawrence: University Press of Kansas, 2010) 
Timothy Stanley, The Crusader: The Life and Tumultuous Times of Pat Buchanan (New York: Thomas Dunne, 2012) 
Jonathan Bell and Timothy Stanley (eds.), Making Sense of American Liberalism (Champaign: University of Illinois Press, 2012) 
Timothy Stanley, Citizen Hollywood: How the Collaboration between LA and DC Revolutionized American Politics (New York: Thomas Dunne Books, 2014)

External links
Tim Stanley's Daily Telegraph blog

References

1982 births
Living people
Alumni of Trinity College, Cambridge
British historians
British male journalists
Converts to Roman Catholicism from Anglicanism
English columnists
People educated at The Judd School
People from Sevenoaks
The Daily Telegraph people
English Anglo-Catholics
English Roman Catholics
Labour Party (UK) parliamentary candidates